Julia Margaret Guerin Halloran Lavender (23 April 1858 in Williamstown, Victoria – 26 July 1923 in Adelaide, South Australia), known popularly as Bella Guerin, was an Australian feminist, women's activist, women's suffragist, anti-conscriptionist, political activist and schoolteacher.

Early life
Guerin was born on 23 April 1858 in Williamstown, Victoria. She was the daughter of Julia Margaret (née Kearney) and Patrick Guerin; her parents were both born in Ireland. Her father worked as a penal sergeant and rose to the rank of governor of gaols.

Having studied at home to pass matriculation in 1878, Bella became the first woman to graduate from an Australian university when she gained her B.A. from the University of Melbourne in December 1883, becoming M.A. upon application in 1885.

Career

Teaching
She taught first at Loreto College, Victoria, urging higher education scholarships for Catholic girls to produce 'a band of noble thoughtful women as a powerful influence for good'.

She married civil servant and poet Henry Halloran at St. Patrick's Cathedral, Melbourne, on 29 June 1891. Halloran, then aged 80, had addressed a laudatory poem to her after seeing a graduation portrait in 1884. He died in Sydney on 19 May 1893, leaving her with an infant son, Henry Marco. A second marriage at Christ Church, St Kilda, Melbourne on 1 October 1909 to George D'Arcie Lavender, thirty years her junior, was apparently short lived.

Returning to teaching from financial necessity, Bella taught in Sydney, then Carlton, Prahran and East Melbourne. From the mid-1890s she frequented suffragist circles, becoming office-bearer in the Bendigo Women's Franchise League while running University College, Bendigo from 1898 - 1903. From 1904 to 1917 she taught at Camperdown and in a succession of small Melbourne schools at South Yarra, St Kilda, Parkville and Brunswick with diminishing success. Her increasing political activity and disputes over conditions with the Education Department probably contributed to this outcome.

Women's Political Association
As vice-president of the Women's Political Association in 1912 - 1914 Guerin co-authored Vida Goldstein's 1913 Senate election pamphlet, but dual membership of non-party feminist and Labor Party organizations proved untenable. From 1914 she wrote and spoke for the Labor and Victorian Socialist parties and the Women's League of Socialists, and was recognized as a 'witty, cogent and instructive' commentator on a range of controversial social issues; they included the rights of illegitimate children, "brotherhood and sisterhood without sex distinction" and defence of English militant suffragettes.

Anti-war
An ardent anti-war propagandist, she led the Labor Women's Anti-Conscription Fellowship campaign during the 1916 referendum and spoke in Adelaide, Broken Hill and Victorian metropolitan and country centres against militarism and in defence of rights of assembly and free speech.

Politics
Appointed vice-president of the Australian Labor Party's Women's Central Organizing Committee in March 1918, she aroused censure and controversy for describing Labor women as "performing poodles and packhorses", under-represented in policy decisions and relegated to auxiliary fund raising roles. Henceforth she organized for Labor "only so far as it stands for those principles represented by the Red Flag", believing in the parliamentary system but desiring capitalism's elimination.

Religion
In religion she moved from Roman Catholicism to rationalism. She described her political evolution as from "Imperialistic butterfly" to "democratic grub" and experienced continual tensions as a socialist feminist within the Labor Party.

Personal life
Her son, who practised as a doctor in Adelaide from 1915, described her as "the kindest and most gentle of women"; she saw herself as a "national idealist" and an "incorrigible militant", promoting women's participation in public life. She was regarded as an orator of "unique talents".

She died in Adelaide on 26 July 1923 of cirrhosis of the liver, aged 65, and was buried in the Catholic cemetery at West Terrace.

Legacy
Being that Bella Guerin spent time teaching in Ballarat, the University of Ballarat (now known as Federation University Australia) honoured her by naming one of the two Mt Helen campus' Halls of Residence after her (the other being named after Peter Lalor, who led the Eureka Stockade in Ballarat)

Guerin Place in the Canberra suburb of Chisholm is named in her honour.

See also
 Henry Halloran, first husband

References

1858 births
1923 deaths
19th-century Australian women
Australian feminists
Australian people of Irish descent
Australian Roman Catholics
Australian schoolteachers
Australian socialists
Australian socialist feminists
Australian suffragists
Australian women of World War I
Deaths from cirrhosis
Non-interventionism
People from Adelaide
People from Ballarat
University of Melbourne alumni
University of Melbourne women
People from Williamstown, Victoria